"Die, Die My Darling" is a song by the American horror punk band Misfits. It was released in May 1984 on singer Glenn Danzig's label, Plan 9 Records, seven months after the band's breakup. The song is titled after the 1965 horror film Fanatic, which had been released in the United States under the title Die! Die! My Darling! The cover of the single is derived from the cover of the September 1953 issue number 19 of the comic book Chamber of Chills. The back cover artwork was created by artist Pushead.

Background
The "Die, Die My Darling" single was released nine months after the Misfits' October 1983 breakup. "Die, Die My Darling" was recorded in August 1981 during sessions for Walk Among Us, but was not included on the album. A live version of "Mommy, Can I Go Out & Kill Tonight" did appear on Walk Among Us, which was released in March 1982. "We Bite" and the studio version of "Mommy, Can I Go Out & Kill Tonight" were recorded in a different session in October 1982. "Die, Die My Darling" was remixed and added, along with "We Bite", to the international version of the 1983 album Earth A.D./Wolfs Blood. All three tracks were added to subsequent reissues of Earth A.D./Wolfs Blood, in addition to being released as the "Die, Die My Darling" single.

Release
The first pressing run of "Die, Die My Darling" consisted of 5000 black and 500 purple 12" vinyl copies, all with "C&P Hell-bent Music" on center labels. The second pressing run consisted of 500 white 12" vinyl copies. The vinyl has since been reprinted through Caroline Records.

 "Die, Die My Darling" and "Mommy, Can I Go Out & Kill Tonight" were both included on the 1986 compilation album Misfits, while "We Bite" was included on Collection II in 1995. All three tracks were included in the boxed set The Misfits, released in 1996.

Critical reception
Victor W. Valdivia of AllMusic reviewed "Die, Die My Darling" positively, and wrote that the title song "ranks amongs the best the Misfits ever recorded -- pure, brutal energy unleashed." Aaron Lariviere of Stereogum ranked "Die, Die My Darling" as the best Misfits song, writing that "Never once does the energy flag. The stomp that launches the song out the gate carries through the entire running time, building up to stomp even harder before crumbling to chaos at the end", and calling it "the perfect sendoff for one of the best punk bands of all time".

Track listing

Personnel

The Misfits
 Glenn Danzig - vocals
 Doyle - guitar
 Jerry Only - bass guitar
 Arthur Googy - drums on "Die, Die My Darling"
 Robo - drums on "Mommy, Can I Go Out & Kill Tonight" and "We Bite"

Production
 Spot – production

Metallica version

"Die, Die My Darling" was covered by the American heavy metal band Metallica, who had previously covered the Misfits songs "Last Caress" and "Green Hell" in 1987, for their 1998 cover album Garage Inc. Metallica's version was released as a single in Australia, Germany, Japan, and Mexico, and reached number 26 on Billboard Mainstream Rock Tracks chart in the United States.

Misfits guitarist Doyle Wolfgang von Frankenstein praised the cover version saying that "I couldn’t believe it when I first heard it!"

Track listing

Personnel
James Hetfield – lead vocals, rhythm guitar
Kirk Hammett – lead guitar, backing vocals
Jason Newsted – bass guitar, backing vocals
Lars Ulrich – drums, percussion

Charts

Release history

See also
Misfits discography

References

1984 singles
1999 singles
Misfits (band) songs
Horror punk songs
Metallica songs
Songs written by Glenn Danzig
1984 songs